The Glasgow Dental Hospital and School is a dental teaching hospital, situated in the Garnethill area of the city centre of Glasgow, Scotland.

History
The Glasgow Dental School was formed as part of Anderson's College in 1879. It moved to Dalhousie Street in 1903.

The current hospital is a category B listed Art Deco building with its entrance on Renfrew Street, which was designed by Wylie, Wright and Wylie and completed in 1931; in 1928 a football tournament was held between the local teams explicitly to raise funds for its construction, won by Partick Thistle and providing £819 (equivalent to around £50,000 90 years later). The Dental School began issuing the Bachelor of Dental Surgery Degree of the University of Glasgow in 1948.

A large extension fronting Sauchiehall Street was completed in the brutalist style by Melville Dundas & Whitson in 1970. The Glasgow Dental Education Centre, which is located adjacent to the Dental School, provides post-graduate and distance dental education.

References

Dental schools in Scotland
Hospital buildings completed in 1931
Hospitals established in 1879
Hospitals in Glasgow
Category B listed buildings in Glasgow
Listed hospital buildings in Scotland
Listed educational buildings in Scotland
1879 establishments in Scotland
Teaching hospitals in Scotland
Schools of the University of Glasgow
1931 establishments in Scotland
NHS Scotland hospitals